Joseph George Smyth (May 22, 1929 – June 10, 1999) was an American National Basketball Association (NBA) player. He was drafted with the seventy-seventh overall pick in the ninth round of the 1953 NBA Draft by the New York Knicks. He made his NBA debut on December 30, 1953 for the Knicks and played eight games with them. Joe finished the 1953-54 NBA season with the Baltimore Bullets averaging career totals of 3.3 points and 2.5 rebounds per game.

References

1929 births
1999 deaths
American men's basketball players
Baltimore Bullets (1944–1954) players
Basketball players from New York City
New York Knicks draft picks
New York Knicks players
Niagara Purple Eagles men's basketball players
Small forwards